The Battle of Vänersborg was fought between Swedish and Norwegian forces during the Torstenson War in 1645. The Swedes were victorious and the Norwegians retreated to Bohuslän.

Vänersborg
Vänersborg